Phineas and Ferb is an animated television show.

Phineas and Ferb may refer to:

 Phineas and Ferb (soundtrack), a soundtrack for the show
 Phineas and Ferb (video game), a video game based on the show
 Phineas Flynn and Ferb Fletcher, the two protagonists of the show